Bernard C. Whittemore (1807December 7, 1856) served as the Treasurer of Michigan.

Early life
Whittemore was born near Rome, New York in 1807. He later moved to Pontiac, Michigan.

Career
Whittemore served as Michigan State Treasurer from 1850 to 1854. Whittemore was a Democrat.

Death
Whittemore died on December 7, 1856.

References

1807 births
1856 deaths
People from New York (state)
Politicians from Pontiac, Michigan
Michigan Democrats
State treasurers of Michigan
19th-century American politicians